Gustav "Gustl" Berauer (5 November 1912 – 18 May 1986) was an ethnic German Czechoslovak nordic combined skier who competed in the 1930s. He was born in Petzer, Bohemia, Austria-Hungary, which is now known as Pec pod Sněžkou in the Czech Republic.

At the 1936 Winter Olympics in Garmisch-Partenkirchen, Berauer finished 14th in the Nordic combined, 21st in the 18 km cross-country event and was part of the Czechoslovak team that finished 5th in the 4 x 10 km relay.

His real strength lay in the Nordic combined. He won a gold medal in that individual event at the 1939 FIS Nordic World Ski Championships in Zakopane while competing for Nazi Germany in the wake of Czechoslovakia being annexed in late 1938.  It was the first German world champion in Nordic skiing. At the World Championships in 1941 in Cortina d'Ampezzo, he successfully defended his title. The World Championship, associated with the International Ski Federation (FIS), was officially cancelled in 1946.
 
During World War II Berauer was a sergeant in the Gebirgsjäger corps. After the war he was incapable of returning to his sport due to a serious injury on the Eastern Front. From 1963 to 1975, he was the Chairman of the FIS Committee "Nordic combined". In 1986, Berauer died in Schliersee, Bavaria, Germany.

References

External links

1912 births
1986 deaths
People from Pec pod Sněžkou
People from the Kingdom of Bohemia
German Bohemian people
Sudeten German people
Czech male cross-country skiers
Czech male Nordic combined skiers
Czechoslovak male cross-country skiers
Czechoslovak male Nordic combined skiers
German male cross-country skiers
German male Nordic combined skiers
Cross-country skiers at the 1936 Winter Olympics
Nordic combined skiers at the 1936 Winter Olympics
FIS Nordic World Ski Championships medalists in Nordic combined
German Army soldiers of World War II
Czechoslovak emigrants to Germany
Sportspeople from the Hradec Králové Region
Gebirgsjäger of World War II